LCI may refer to:

Organizations
 La Chaîne Info, a French television news channel
 LCI Communications, a defunct Canadian telecommunications company
 Lease Corporation International, an airliner lessor based in Dublin, Ireland
 London Clubs International, a British gambling company
 Lions Clubs International, an international service organization based in Chicago Illinois, United States

Educational institutions
 LaSalle College International, in Jakarta and Surabaya, Indonesia
 Leibniz Center for Informatics, in Germany
 Lethbridge Collegiate Institute, in Alberta, Canada
 Liquid Crystal Institute, at Kent State University, Ohio, United States
 Lisgar Collegiate Institute, in Ottawa, Ontario, Canada
 Louisiana Culinary Institute, in Baton Rouge, Louisiana, United States

Other
 Laguna Copperplate Inscription, in the National Museum of the Philippines
 Landing Craft Infantry
 Life Cycle Impulse, a BMW term for facelift or update to existing series
 Life cycle inventory, part of a life cycle assessment
 Liga Comunista Internacionalista (Internationalist Communist League (Portugal)), former Trotskyist party in Portugal
 Lighthouse Chapel International, a church based in Ghana
 Liquid contact indicator, an indicator in the form of a sticker that changes color after contact with liquids
 Loaded chamber indicator, a firearm safety device

See also

 LC1 (disambiguation)
 LCL (disambiguation) 
 ICL (disambiguation) 
 ICI (disambiguation) 

 
 LCII (disambiguation)